The Spring Engine (also termed SpringRTS and formerly TA Spring), is a game engine for real-time strategy (RTS) video games. The game engine is free and open-source software, subject to the terms of the GNU General Public License v2.0 or later.

History 

The development was initiated by Stefan Johansson, Tomaz Kunaver, and Jelmer Cnossen, members of the Swedish Yankspankers game clan under the name TA Spring. Since 2005 it is being developed by the community. The project aimed originally to bring the gameplay experience of Total Annihilation into three dimensions and to have the game run the mods and third-party units from Total Annihilation. The first release was on July 7, 2007, achieving its initial goals.

Since then, the project evolved from a mere TA clone to a general RTS game engine including more flexible features like built-in high-level extensibility through a Lua scripting interface. Most of the games running on the engine (as of December 2010) are focused on multiplayer gameplay. There are also currently a number of single player missions, built on frameworks utilizing the engine's Lua scripting abilities. There are also a large number of skirmish artificial intelligences (AIs), allowing for offline play or extra players in an online game.

Software architecture
Most Spring Engine-based games are designed to be played online, in multiplayer matches. The Spring Engine uses a deterministic game simulation which is executed simultaneously on all game clients. Only user commands are sent to other players, preventing any active cheating. Multiplayer is supported on both Linux and Windows. A pre-game lobby uses a specially designed protocol similar to that of Internet Relay Chat to facilitate chat, player match-making, and the adjustment of battle options. A number of spring lobby clients exist.

The lobbies for the game allow setting up single player games also. This can be done either by using a special single player mode, or using the multiplayer mode with a password and adding bots to the game. Instead of using bots, some games also support special game modes that allow single player gameplay. Most popular in this area are the "chicken" modes of Zero-K and Balanced Annihilation, where a player has to defend against waves of monsters. Since version 0.79, Spring also features missions. A mission editor with advanced functions while being intuitive is bundled with the game.

Skirmish AIs (or bots) are needed to get a normal single player game running. They take over the role of controlling a team and can therefore be seen as a machine equivalent to a human player but are of course less cunning. The engine supports Skirmish AI plug-ins to be written in a variety of programming languages. Currently these are Lua, C, C++, Python and the JVM languages like Java and Groovy. It is also possible to develop plug-ins to support more languages.

Springs rendering features include deformable terrain, 3D projectiles and multiple water renderers. The unit files of Total Annihilation are compatible, allowing third-party units to be imported.  The scripting language allows for a customizable gameplay and user interface modifications. Team Players can also draw and write on the game map to coordinate tactical moves with other players. The third-party AI allows for varying degrees of difficulty. Alternatively, the SpringRTS Lobby can be downloaded at mirrors.

Source code
Springs source code, licensed under the GNU GPL-2.0-or-later, is primarily written in the programming language C++, as is springlobby. An alternative lobby, TASClient, is written in Delphi, and there are lobby servers - used to organize multi-player games - written in Java and Python. The C++ code structure is written in an object-oriented manner and is documented to some extent using Doxygen. The official source code package includes project files for various integrated development environments (IDEs) and building tools, including CMake, KDevelop, Visual C++ 7.0/8.0, and Xcode.

Reception and adoption
Various games leveraging the Spring engine range from free content games with minimal restrictions on use and distribution to games with commercially licensed art, such as P.U.R.E. Additionally, content from Total Annihilation has been modified to run on the Spring Engine, although playing games that incorporate such content requires that one own a copy of the original Total Annihilation game.

Spring has many games in various stages of development. Some are based upon and use content from the original Total Annihilation game, this includes the games: Balanced Annihilation, Tech Annihilation, NOTA, and XTA. However, there are many games which are derivatives of other works of fiction, such as a Gundam game, a Warhammer 40,000 game, and a Star Wars game based on the Galactic Civil War. There are also several fully original games, including "Expand & Exterminate", a strategic game inspired by Earth 2150, "The Cursed", a unique mixture of science fiction and fantasy, and "Kernel Panic", a Darwinia-esque game emphasizing simplicity. The website also distributes tools and instructions for making your own game.

Balanced Annihilation
As the name suggests, the game rebalanced Absolute Annihilation, which was a rebalanced version of the Total Annihilation game Uberhack. The unit stats have been modified from Uberhack's base stats making it very dissimilar to Uberhack. It features all the previous units from retail version of Total Annihilation, plus several extras for each faction. The balance does not reflect Total Annihilation gameplay as much as an augmented version of Total Annihilation.

Beyond All Reason 
Beyond All Reason (also known as BAR) is a fork of Balanced Annihilation and also based on the Spring engine. It is an open-source project under active development. Although the gameplay is similar to Total Annihilation, the project does not aim to be just a copy of the original game.

Zero-K
Zero-K (formerly known as Complete Annihilation) started as a fork of Balanced Annihilation, and so can trace its heritage all the way back to the original Total Annihilation. However, all the original Cavedog content has been replaced with original community-provided content. Among Spring games, Zero-K is notable for its extensive use of Lua scripting for interface and gameplay enhancements, and unique RTS concepts such as a flat technology tree. Zero-K was released on Steam as a standalone game on 27 April 2018.

NOTA
NOTA (Not Original Total Annihilation) is a game designed for larger maps with to-scale units, fuel for airplanes and accent for strategic decisions. It has a unique navy, more diversified unit types, and a slower tech/econ development then other TA themed games (BA, XTA). NOTA games can be very quick, seeing only T1 units, or very long, ending with the appearance of incredible superweapons.

The Cursed
This unique game is about an undead demonic army that corrupts the universe and is opposed by humankind. The artistic setup is inspired by arts from Doom I and II, Warcraft III and Warhammer table tops. The free game is released.

P.U.R.E.
P.U.R.E. is set in a time when humans are at war against an evil AI called the Overmind. It is developed by one person, known by the Spring community as Argh. The game features up to 57 unique units, new and improved GUI, a unique resource system and 2 different sides, and a main menu (though not in-game). P.U.R.E. is featured in ModDB and several other review sites.

Spring:1944

Spring:1944 is one of the most-developed games on the Spring engine, and as the name suggests is based on the later years of World War II. It contains nearly 300 unique units across the four major belligerent factions (United States, United Kingdom, Nazi Germany and the USSR), with all content being produced by several main developers and a handful of contributors, and is the most popular independent production project on the Spring engine. Unlike most conventional WW2-themed real-time strategy games, Spring: 1944 is heavily "epic" in scope, with players commanding hundreds of units and multiplayer team games involving thousands of infantry, vehicles, tanks and aircraft.

Kernel Panic
Kernel Panic is a game that has no connection to Total Annihilation. In this game, there are three races: The System, the Network and the Hacker, all having their own advantages and disadvantages. The game takes place inside of a computer, leading to intense, fast-paced gameplay. There are no resources in Kernel Panic, so the player can build units until the map is full. The game's textures and sounds resemble old games, and maps are like computer boards and chips.

XTA
Preceding all other active games, XTA, short for eXtended Total Annihilation was the original Total Annihilation based game developed on the Spring Project. It features all units from the retail version of Total Annihilation with a few additional ones added to each faction. Since the original development team there have been various developers of the game, meaning the aim of it may now be skewed, however the game attempts to remain true to its heritage whilst bringing in new game play features.

Evolution RTS
Evolution RTS  was the first Spring-based game released (as free to play) on Steam, in April 2014. It was removed from Steam in April 2020.

Reception 
Spring was reviewed in French print computer magazine "Linux Pratique" in February 2009.

References

External links

Spring on GitHub
Spring on ohloh
Spring download site
Spring players portal
SpringLobby, a cross-platform lobby client for spring

2006 video games
Fangames
Free game engines
Free software programmed in C++
Game engines for Linux
Linux games
Lua (programming language)-scriptable game engines
Lua (programming language)-scripted video games
MacOS games
Open-source video games
Strategy video games
Python (programming language)-scriptable game engines
Real-time strategy video games
Total Annihilation
Windows games